Eynon may refer to:

People 
 Eynon Evans (1904–1989), a Welsh writer and film actor
 Eynon Hawkins (1920–2001), holder of the Albert Medal and George Cross, and Welsh professional rugby league footballer
 John Eynon (?–1539), a monk and priest martyred during the English dissolution of the monasteries
 John Hicks Eynon (1801–1888), a Bible Christian minister born in China

Places 
 Port Eynon, a village and community in the city and county of Swansea, Wales